The Cotswolds is a region in central-southwest England, along a range of rolling hills that rise from the meadows of the upper Thames to an escarpment above the Severn Valley and Evesham Vale.

The area is defined by the bedrock of Jurassic limestone that creates a type of grassland habitat rare in the UK and that is quarried for the golden-coloured Cotswold stone. The predominantly rural landscape contains stone-built villages, towns, and stately homes and gardens featuring the local stone.

Designated as an Area of Outstanding Natural Beauty (AONB) in 1966, the Cotswolds covers  making it the largest AONB. It is the third largest protected landscape in England after the Lake District and Yorkshire Dales national parks. It lies across the boundaries of several English counties; mainly Gloucestershire and Oxfordshire, and parts of Wiltshire, Somerset, Worcestershire, and Warwickshire.

The hills give their name to the Cotswold local government district, formed on 1 April 1974, which is within the county of Gloucestershire. Its main town is Cirencester, where the Cotswold District Council offices are located. The population of the  District was about 83,000 in 2011. The population of the Area of Outstanding Natural Beauty was 139,000 in 2016.

History
The largest excavation of Jurassic-era echinoderm fossils, including of rare and previously unknown species, occurred at a quarry in the Cotswolds in 2021. There is evidence of Neolithic settlement from burial chambers on Cotswold Edge, and there are remains of Bronze and Iron Age forts. Later the Romans built villas, such as at Chedworth, settlements such as Gloucester, and paved the Celtic path later known as Fosse Way.

During the Middle Ages, thanks to the breed of sheep known as the Cotswold Lion, the Cotswolds became prosperous from the wool trade with the continent, with much of the money made from wool directed towards the building of churches. The most successful era for the wool trade was 1250–1350; much of the wool at that time was sold to Italian merchants. The area still preserves numerous large, handsome Cotswold Stone "wool churches". The affluent area in the 21st century has attracted wealthy Londoners and others who own second homes there or have chosen to retire to the Cotswolds.

Etymology
The name Cotswold is popularly attributed the meaning "sheep enclosure in rolling hillsides", incorporating the term, wold, meaning hills. Compare also the Weald from the Saxon/German word Wald meaning 'forest'. However, the English Place-Name Society has for many years accepted that the term Cotswold is derived from Codesuualt of the 12th century or other variations on this form, the etymology of which was given, 'Cod's-wold', which is 'Cod's high open land'. Cod was interpreted as an Old English personal name, which may be recognised in further names: Cutsdean, Codeswellan, and Codesbyrig, some of which date back to the eighth century AD. It has subsequently been noticed that "Cod" could derive philologically from a Brittonic female cognate "Cuda", a hypothetical mother goddess in Celtic mythology postulated to have been worshipped in the Cotswold region.

Geography

The spine of the Cotswolds runs southwest to northeast through six counties, particularly Gloucestershire, west Oxfordshire and southwestern Warwickshire. The northern and western edges of the Cotswolds are marked by steep escarpments down to the Severn valley and the Warwickshire Avon. This feature, known as the Cotswold escarpment, or sometimes the Cotswold Edge, is a result of the uplifting (tilting) of the limestone layer, exposing its broken edge. This is a cuesta, in geological terms. The dip slope is to the southeast.

On the eastern boundary lies the city of Oxford and on the west is Stroud. To the southeast, the upper reaches of the Thames Valley and towns such as Lechlade, Tetbury, and Fairford are often considered to mark the limit of this region. To the south the Cotswolds, with the characteristic uplift of the Cotswold Edge, reach beyond Bath, and towns such as Chipping Sodbury and Marshfield share elements of Cotswold character.

The area is characterised by attractive small towns and villages built of the underlying Cotswold stone (a yellow oolitic limestone). This limestone is rich in fossils, particularly of fossilised sea urchins. Cotswold towns include Bourton-on-the-Water, Broadway, Burford, Chalford, Chipping Campden, Chipping Norton, Cricklade, Dursley, Malmesbury, Minchinhampton, Moreton-in-Marsh, Nailsworth, Northleach, Painswick, Stow-on-the-Wold, Stroud, Tetbury, Witney, Winchcombe and Wotton-under-Edge. In addition, much of Box lies in the Cotswolds. Bath, Cheltenham, Cirencester, Gloucester, Stroud, and Swindon are larger urban centres that border on, or are virtually surrounded by, the Cotswold AONB.

The town of Chipping Campden is notable for being the home of the Arts and Crafts movement, founded by William Morris at the end of the 19th and beginning of the 20th centuries. William Morris lived occasionally in Broadway Tower, a folly, now part of a country park. Chipping Campden is also known for the annual Cotswold Olimpick Games, a celebration of sports and games dating back to the early 17th century.

There are also  of historic stone walls.

Economy

A 2017 report on employment within the Area of Outstanding Natural Beauty, stated that the main sources of income were real estate, renting and business activities, manufacturing and wholesale & retail trade repairs. Some 44% of residents were employed in these sectors. Agriculture is also important. Some 86% of the land in the AONB is used for this purpose. The primary crops include barley, beans, rape seed oil and wheat, while the raising of sheep is also important; cows and pigs are also reared. The livestock sector has been declining since 2002, however.

According to the 2011 Census data for the Cotswolds, the wholesale and retail trade was the largest employer (15.8% of the workforce), followed by education (9.7%) and health and social work (9.3%). The report also indicates that a relatively higher proportion of residents were working in agriculture, forestry and fishing, accommodation and food services as well as in professional, scientific and technical activities.

Unemployment in the Cotswold District was among the lowest in the country. A report in August 2017 showed only 315 unemployed persons, a slight decrease of five from a year earlier.

Tourism
Tourism is a significant part of the economy. The Cotswold District area alone gained over £373 million from visitor spending on accommodation, £157 million on local attractions and entertainments, and about £100m on travel in 2016. In the larger Cotswolds Tourism area, including Stroud, Cheltenham, Gloucester and Tewkesbury, tourism generated about £1 billion in 2016, providing 200,000 jobs. Some 38 million day visits were made to the Cotswold Tourism area that year.

Many travel guides direct tourists to Chipping Campden, Stow-on-the-Wold, Bourton-on-the-Water, Broadway, Bibury, and Stanton. Some of these locations can be very crowded at times. Roughly 300,000 people visit Bourton per year, for example, with about half staying for a day or less.

The area also has numerous public walking trails and footpaths that attract visitors, including the  Cotswold Way (part of the National Trails system) from Bath to Chipping Campden.

Housing development
In August 2018, the final decision was made for a Local Plan that would lead to the building of nearly 7,000 additional homes by 2031, in addition to over 3,000 already built. Areas for development include Cirencester, Bourton-on-the-Water, Down Ampney, Fairford, Kemble, Lechlade, Northleach, South Cerney, Stow-on-the-Wold, Tetbury and Moreton-in-Marsh. Some of the money received from developers will be earmarked for new infrastructure to support the increasing population.

Cotswold stone

Cotswold stone is a yellow oolitic Jurassic limestone. This limestone is rich in fossils, particularly of fossilised sea urchins. When weathered, the colour of buildings made or faced with this stone is often described as honey or golden.

The stone varies in colour from north to south, being honey-coloured in the north and north east of the region, as shown in Cotswold villages such as Stanton and Broadway; golden-coloured in the central and southern areas, as shown in Dursley and Cirencester; and pearly white in Bath.

The rock outcrops at places on the Cotswold Edge; small quarries are common. The exposures are rarely sufficiently compact to be good for rock-climbing, but an exception is Castle Rock, on Cleeve Hill, near Cheltenham. Because of the rapid expansion of the Cotswolds in order for nearby areas to capitalize on increased house prices, well-known ironstone villages, such as Hook Norton, have even been claimed by some to be in the Cotswolds despite lacking key features of Cotswolds villages such as Cotswold stone, and are instead built using a deep red/orange ironstone, known locally as Hornton Stone.

In his 1934 book English Journey, J. B. Priestley made this comment about Cotswold buildings made of the local stone.

The truth is that it has no colour that can be described. Even when the sun is obscured and the light is cold, these walls are still faintly warm and luminous, as if they knew the trick of keeping the lost sunlight of centuries glimmering about them

Area of Outstanding Natural Beauty

In 2000, the government confirmed that AONBs have the same landscape quality and status as National Parks.

The Cotswolds AONB, which is the largest in England and Wales, stretches from the border regions of South Warwickshire and Worcestershire, through West Oxfordshire and Gloucestershire, and takes in parts of Wiltshire and of Bath and North East Somerset in the south. Gloucestershire County Council is responsible for sixty-three percent of the AONB.

The Cotswolds Conservation Board has the task of conserving and enhancing the AONB. Established under statute in 2004 as an independent public body, the Board carries out a range of work from securing funding for 'on the ground' conservation projects, to providing a strategic overview of the area for key decision makers, such as planning officials. The Board is funded by Natural England and the seventeen local authorities that are covered by the AONB. The Cotswolds AONB Management Plan 2018–2023 was adopted by the Board in September 2018.

The landscape of the AONB is varied, including escarpment outliers, escarpments, rolling hills and valleys, enclosed limestone valleys, settled valleys, ironstone hills and valleys, high wolds and high wold valleys, high wold dip-slopes, dip-slope lowland and valleys, a Low limestone plateau, cornbrash lowlands, farmed slopes, a broad floodplain valley, a large pastoral lowland vale, a settled unwooded vale, and an unwooded vale.

While the beauty of the Cotswolds AONB is intertwined with that of the villages that seem almost to grow out of the landscape, the Cotswolds were primarily designated an Area of Outstanding Natural Beauty for the rare limestone grassland habitats as well as the old growth beech woodlands that typify the area. These habitat areas are also the last refuge for many other flora and fauna, with some so endangered that they are protected under the Wildlife and Countryside Act 1981. Cleeve Hill, and its associated commons, is a fine example of a limestone grassland and it is one of the few locations where the Duke of Burgundy butterfly may still be found in abundance.

A June 2018 report stated that the AONB receives "23 million visitors a year, the third largest of any protected landscape". Earlier that year, Environment secretary Michael Gove announced that a panel would be formed to consider making some of the AONBs into National Parks. The review will file its report in 2019. In April 2018, the Cotswolds Conservation Board had written to Natural England "requesting that consideration be given to making the Cotswolds a National Park", according to Liz Eyre, Chairman. This has led to some concern as stated by one member of the Cotswold District Council, "National Park designation is a significant step further and raises the prospect of key decision making powers being taken away from democratically elected councillors". In other words, Cotswold District Council would no longer have the authority to grant and refuse housing applications.

The uniqueness and value of the Cotswolds is shown in the fact that five European Special Areas of Conservation, three national nature reserves and more than 80 Sites of Special Scientific Interest are within the Cotswolds AONB.

The Cotswold Voluntary Wardens Service was established in 1968 to help conserve and enhance the area, and now has more than 300 wardens.

In September 2020, the Cotswolds AONB rebranded itself as the "Cotswolds National Landscape", using a proposed name replacement for "Areas of Outstanding Natural Beauty".

Places of interest

Pictured is the Garden of Sudeley Castle at Winchcombe. The present structure was built in the 15th century and may be on the site of a 12th-century castle. It is north of the spa town of Cheltenham which has much Georgian architecture of some merit. Further south, towards Tetbury, is the ancient fortress known as Beverston Castle, founded in 1229 by Maurice de Gaunt. In the same area is Calcot Manor, a manor house with origins in about 1300 as a tithe barn.

Tetbury Market House was built in 1655. During the Middle Ages, Tetbury became an important market for Cotswold wool and yarn. Cirencester Abbey was founded as an Augustinian monastery in 1117 and Malmesbury Abbey was one of the few English houses with a continual history from the 7th century through to the Dissolution of the Monasteries.

An unusual house in this area is Quarwood, a Victorian Gothic house in Stow-on-the-Wold. The grounds, covering , include parkland, fish ponds, paddocks, garages, woodlands and seven cottages. Another is Woodchester Mansion, an unfinished, Gothic revival mansion house in Woodchester Park near Nympsfield. Newark Park is a Grade I listed country house of Tudor origins near the village of Ozleworth, Wotton-under-Edge.

Another of the many manor houses in the area, Owlpen Manor in the village of Owlpen in the Stroud district, is also Tudor and also Grade I listed. Further north, Broadway Tower is a folly on Broadway Hill, near the village of Broadway, Worcestershire.

Top attractions
According to users of the worldwide TripAdvisor travel site, in 2018 the following were among the best attractions in the Cotswolds:

Walks With Hawks, Cheltenham 
Cotswolds Distillery, Stourton
Cotswold Falconry Centre, Moreton-in-Marsh
Mechanical Music Museum, Northleach
Chavenage House, Tetbury
Tewkesbury Abbey, Tewkesbury
Gloucestershire Warwickshire Steam Railway, Cheltenham
Gloucester Cathedral, Gloucester
The Royal Gardens at Highgrove, Tetbury
Jet Age Museum, Gloucester
Cotswold Wildlife Park, Burford
Hook Norton Brewery, Hook Norton

Transport

The Cotswolds lie between the M5, M40 and M4 motorways. The main A-roads through the area are:
 the A46: Bath – Stroud – Cheltenham – Evesham;
 the A419: Swindon – Cirencester – Stroud;
 the A417: Lechlade – Cirencester – Gloucester;
 the A429: Malmesbury – Cirencester – Stow-on-the-Wold – Moreton-in-Marsh;
 the A44: Chipping Norton – Moreton-in-Marsh – Evesham;
 the A40: Oxford – Burford – Cheltenham – Gloucester.
These all roughly follow the routes of ancient roads, some laid down by the Romans, such as Ermin Way and the Fosse Way.

There are local bus services across the area, but some are infrequent.

The River Thames flows from the Cotswolds and is navigable from Inglesham and Lechlade-on-Thames downstream to Oxford. West of Inglesham. the Thames and Severn Canal and the Stroudwater Navigation connected the Thames to the River Severn; this route is mostly disused nowadays but several parts are in the process of being restored.

Railways
The area is bounded by two major rail routes: in the south by the main Bristol–Bath–London line (including the South Wales main line) and in the west by the Bristol–Birmingham main line. In addition, the Cotswold line runs through the Cotswolds from Oxford to Worcester, and the Golden Valley line runs across the hills from Swindon via Stroud to Gloucester, carrying fast and local services.

Mainline rail services to the big cities run from railway stations such as Bath, Swindon, Oxford, Cheltenham, and Worcester. Mainline trains run by Great Western Railway to London Paddington also are available from Kemble station near Cirencester, Kingham station near Stow-on-the-Wold, Charlbury station, and Moreton-in-Marsh station.

Additionally, there is the Gloucestershire Warwickshire Railway, a steam heritage railway over part of the closed Stratford–Cheltenham line, running from Cheltenham Racecourse through Gotherington, Winchcombe, and Hayles Abbey Halt to Toddington and Laverton. The preserved line has been extended to Broadway.

In culture

The Cotswold region has inspired several notable English composers. In the early 1900s, Herbert Howells and Ivor Gurney used to take long walks together over the hills, and Gurney urged Howells to make the landscape, including the nearby Malvern Hills, the inspiration for his future work. In 1916, Howells wrote his first major piece, the Piano Quartet in A minor, inspired by the magnificent view of the Malverns; he dedicated it to "the hill at Chosen (Churchdown) and Ivor Gurney who knows it". Another contemporary of theirs, Gerald Finzi, lived in nearby Painswick.

Gustav Holst, who was born in Cheltenham, spent much of his early years playing the organ in Cotswold village churches, including at Cranham, after which village he titled his tune for In the Bleak Midwinter. He also called his Symphony in F major, Op. 8 H47 The Cotswolds.

Holst’s friend, the composer Ralph Vaughan Williams, was born at Down Ampney in the Cotswolds and, though he moved to Surrey as a boy, he gave the name of his native village to the tune for Come Down, O Love Divine.  He also composed his opera Hugh the Drover from 1913 to 1924, which depicts life in a Cotswold village and incorporates local folk melodies. In 1988, the 6th symphony (Op. 109) of composer Derek Bourgeois was titled "A Cotswold Symphony".
 
The Cotswolds are a popular location for filming scenes for movies and television programmes. The film Better Things (2008), directed by Duane Hopkins, is set in a small Cotswold village. The fictional detective Agatha Raisin lives in the fictional village of Carsely in the Cotswolds.

Other movies filmed in the Cotswolds or nearby, at least in part, include some of the Harry Potter series (Gloucester Cathedral), Bridget Jones's Diary (Snowshill), Pride and Prejudice (Cheltenham Town Hall), and Braveheart (Cotswold Farm Park). In 2014, some scenes of the 2016 movie Alice Through the Looking Glass were filmed at the Gloucester Docks just outside the Cotswold District; some scenes for the 2006 movie Amazing Grace were also filmed at the Docks.

The television series Father Brown was almost entirely filmed in the Cotswolds. Scenes and buildings in Sudeley Castle was often featured in the series. The vicarage in Blockley was used for the main character's residence and the Anglican St Peter and St Paul church was the Roman Catholic St Mary's in the series.  Other filming locations included Guiting Power, the former hospital in Moreton-in-Marsh, the Winchcombe railway station, Lower Slaughter, and St Peter's Church in Upper Slaughter.

In the 2010s, BBC TV series Poldark, the location for Ross Poldark's family home "Trenwith" is Chavenage House, Tetbury, which is open to the public.

Many exterior shots of village life in the Downton Abbey TV series were filmed in Bampton, Oxfordshire. Other filming locations in that county included Swinbrook, Cogges, and Shilton.

The city of Bath hosted crews that filmed parts of the movies Vanity Fair, Persuasion, Dracula, and The Duchess. Gloucester and other places in Gloucestershire, some within the Area of Natural Beauty, have been a popular location for filming period films and television programmes over the years. Gloucester Cathedral has been particularly popular.

The sighting of peregrine falcons in the landscape of the Cotswolds is mentioned in The Peregrine by John Alec Baker.

The television documentary agriculture-themed series Clarkson's Farm were filmed at various locations around Chipping Norton.

See also
 Chilterns
 Cotswold architecture
 Geology of Great Britain

References

Further reading
 Brace, Catherine. "Looking back: the Cotswolds and English national identity, c. 1890–1950." Journal of Historical Geography 25.4 (1999): 502-516.
 Brace, Catherine. "A pleasure ground for the noisy herds? Incompatible encounters with the Cotswolds and England, 1900–1950." Rural History 11.1 (2000): 75-94.
 Briggs, Katharine Mary. The folklore of the Cotswolds (BT Batsford Limited, 1974).
 Hilton, R. H. "The Cotswolds and Regional History." History Today (July 1953) 3#7 pp 490–499.
 Verey, David Cecil Wynter. The buildings of England: Gloucestershire. I. The Cotswolds (Penguin Books, 1979).

External links

 National Character Area profile – Natural England
 Cotswolds Area of Outstanding Natural Beauty – Cotswolds Conservation Board
 Cotswolds Tourism Partnership
 Independent tourist guides:
 cotswolds.org
 thecotswolds.com
 icotswolds.com
 Explore Gloucestershire

 
Hills of Gloucestershire
Hills of Oxfordshire
Hills of Somerset
Hills of Warwickshire
Hills of Wiltshire
Hills of Worcestershire
Protected areas of Gloucestershire
Protected areas of Oxfordshire
Protected areas of Somerset
Protected areas of Warwickshire
Protected areas of Wiltshire
Protected areas of Worcestershire
Areas of Outstanding Natural Beauty in England
Natural regions of England